Placostylus fibratus is a species of large air-breathing land snail, a pulmonate gastropod mollusk in the family Bothriembryontidae. This species is endemic to New Caledonia.

Subspecies
 Placostylus fibratus alexander (Crosse, 1855)
 Placostylus fibratus fibratus (Martyn, 1784)
 Placostylus fibratus goroensis (Souverbie, 1870)
 Placostylus fibratus guestieri (Gassies, 1869)
 Placostylus fibratus ouveanus (Mousson, 1869)
 Placostylus fibratus souvillei (Morelet, 1857)

Known locally as bulime, the snails are considered a highly prized delicacy on Ile des Pins and are locally farmed to ensure supply.

References

 Neubert, E., Chérel-Mora C. & Bouchet P. (2009). Polytypy, clines, and fragmentation: The bulimes of New Caledonia revisited (Pulmonata, Orthalicoidea, Placostylidae). In P. Grancolas (ed.), Zoologia Neocaledonica 7. Biodiversity studies in New Caledonia. Mémoires du Muséum National d'Histoire Naturelle. 198: 37-131

External links
 Martyn T. (1784-1787). The universal conchologist, exhibiting the figure of every known shells. London, published by the author. 4 vols. 40 pp., 80 pls
 Martyn T. (1784-1787). The universal conchologist, exhibiting the figure of every known shells. London, published by the author. 4 vols. 40 pp., 80 pls.
 Müller, O. F. (1774). Vermium terrestrium et fluviatilium, seu animalium infusorium, Helminthicorum, et testaceorum, non marinorum, succincta historia. vol 2: I-XXXVI, 1-214, 10 unnumbered pages. Havniae et Lipsiae, apud Heineck et Faber, ex officina Molleriana.
 Röding, P.F. (1798). Museum Boltenianum sive Catalogus cimeliorum e tribus regnis naturæ quæ olim collegerat Joa. Fried Bolten, M. D. p. d. per XL. annos proto physicus Hamburgensis. Pars secunda continens Conchylia sive Testacea univalvia, bivalvia & multivalvia. Trapp, Hamburg. viii, 199 pp
 Schumacher, C. F. (1817). Essai d'un nouveau système des habitations des vers testacés. Schultz, Copenghagen. iv + 288 pp., 22 pls. 

fibratus
Endemic fauna of New Caledonia
Gastropods described in 1789
Taxonomy articles created by Polbot